Simmons High School may refer to:
 Simmons High School (Mississippi), Hollandale School District
 Philip Simmons High School, Charleston, South Carolina